Bahçeyazı is a village in the Erzincan District, Erzincan Province, Turkey. The village had a population of 49 in 2021.

References 

Villages in Erzincan District